Eknath Sashti is a festival held on the day on which the sant eknath left his body in the River Godavari and took Jala samadhi at Paithan. The day occurs every year in Falgun (a Marathi month usually occurring in March or April).

References

External links
 https://web.archive.org/web/20150721233242/http://santeknath.org/eknath%20shashthi.html
 https://archive.today/20130122074424/http://epaper.esakal.com/esakal/20100307/5734227853179693953.htm
 http://news.oneindia.in/2006/03/23/paithan-to-be-developed-in-line-with-shirdi-jamadar-1143133413.html

Hindu holy days
March observances
April observances
Hindu festivals